The Secunderabad–Nagpur Superfast Express is a Superfast train belonging to South Central Railway zone that runs between  and  in India. It is currently being operated with 12771/12772 train numbers on tri-weekly basis. And now it has been extended up to Raipur.

Service

The 12771/Secunderabad–Nagpur SF Express has an average speed of 56 km/hr and covers 575 km in 10h 15m. The 12772/Nagpur–Secunderabad SF Express has an average speed of 55 km/hr and covers 575 km in 10h 25m.

Route and halts 

The important halts of the train are:

Coach composition

The train runs with modern LHB rakes with max speed of 110 kmph. The train consists of 17 coaches:

 2 AC II Tier
 1 AC III Tier
 8 Sleeper coaches
 4 General Unreserved
 2 Seating cum Luggage Rake

Traction

Both trains are hauled by a Lallaguda electric loco shed-based WAP-7 electric locomotive from Nagpur to Secunderabad and vice versa.

See also 

 Nagpur Junction railway station
 Secunderabad Junction railway station

Notes

References

External links 

 12771/Secunderabad - Nagpur SF Express
 12772/Nagpur - Secunderabad SF Express

Transport in Secunderabad
Transport in Nagpur
Express trains in India
Rail transport in Telangana
Rail transport in Maharashtra
Railway services introduced in 2013